Steven McDougall (born 17 June 1986) is a Scottish professional footballer who plays with the York Region Shooters in the Canadian Soccer League.

Career
McDougall started his career as a professional youth player at Rangers before moving on to Airdrie United aged 17. He was part of the Airdrie team that won the Scottish Second Division and the Scottish Challenge Cup.

On 4 July 2009, McDougall signed for Dunfermline on a two-year contract. He scored his first goal for the Pars against Partick Thistle on 14 November on his first start for the club. Having been signed from Airdrie as a wide player, McDougall gradually adjusted to the role of a striker during his first season at the Pars and went on to score 6 goals for the Pars during the 2009–10 campaign.

In 2011 Dunfermline and McDougall won promotion to the Scottish Premier League. Dunfermline defeated Greenock Morton 2–0 to clinch the title with McDougall opening the scoring. Dunfermline were relegated from the 2011–12 Scottish Premier League and McDougall signed for Dumbarton F.C .

McDougall signed for Dumbarton in June 2012. He signed a new contract for the 2013–14 season on 18 May, his third season with the club. In December 2014 Steven left the club after 65 appearances over 2 and a half years.
He joined Clyde in January 2015. McDougall made his debut for Clyde at Hampden Park in a 1-1. He scored his first goal in a 2–0 over Albion Rovers at Cliftonhill. At the end of the 2014–15 season, McDougall opted to leave Clyde FC in the summer 2015 to further progress his career internationally. In 2015, he went overseas to Canada to sign with the York Region Shooters of the Canadian Soccer League.

Honours

Airdrie United
 Scottish Challenge Cup: (1), 2008–09
 Scottish Second Division
 Young Player of the Year

Dunfermline Athletic
 Scottish First Division: (1), 2010–11

See also
Dunfermline Athletic F.C. season 2009–10

References

External links

Living people
1986 births
Rangers F.C. players
Airdrieonians F.C. players
Dunfermline Athletic F.C. players
Scottish Football League players
Scottish footballers
Footballers from Paisley, Renfrewshire
Association football forwards
Scottish Premier League players
Dumbarton F.C. players
Scottish Professional Football League players
Clyde F.C. players
York Region Shooters players
Canadian Soccer League (1998–present) players
Scottish expatriate sportspeople in Canada
Expatriate soccer players in Canada
Scottish expatriate footballers